Bulgaria–Egypt relations are foreign relations between Bulgaria and Egypt. Bulgaria has an embassy in Cairo. Egypt has an embassy in Sofia. Both countries are full members of the Union for the Mediterranean. The Bulgarian Minister of Economy visited Cairo on the 28th of November to the 2nd of December for EDEX 2021, alongside 12 other Bulgarian companies with Egyptian President Abdel Fattah El-Sisi and Rumen Radev expressing intent for increased trade and co-operation.

See also 
 Foreign relations of Bulgaria
 Foreign relations of Egypt

References

External links 
 Bulgarian embassy in Cairo

 
Egypt
Bulgaria